is a Japanese singer under management of Stardust Music. She is signed to Chimera Energy, a label handled by Universal Music Japan.

In 2010, Natori became the permanent vocalist for the hip-hop/reggae band Spontania. As a member of the band, she is referred to as "Kaori" (in romaji).

Discography

Album 
 "Perfume", 24 May 2006

Singles 
 "Gentleman", 26 January 2005, #140
 "Player", 18 May 2005, #143
 "Darling", 14 September 2005, #196
 "Goodbye" (featuring Nao'ymt), 1 February 2006
 "Lovespace", 19 April 2006
 "Stay", 30 August 2006
 "This Time", 6 December 2006
  Shower wo Abiru Mae ni, 22 August 2007
  Subete ga aru basho, 2 December 2007

External links 
 Stardust Music profile
 Kaori Natori@Oricon Style
 Kaori's space (French fansite)

References 

1982 births
Living people
Singers from Tokyo
21st-century Japanese singers
21st-century Japanese women singers